The women's 200 metre freestyle event at the 11th FINA World Swimming Championships (25m) took place 16 December 2012 at the Sinan Erdem Dome.

Records
Prior to this competition, the existing world and championship records were as follows.

No new records were set during this competition.

Results

Heats

Final

The final was held at 21:03.

References

Freestyle 0200 metre, women's
World Short Course Swimming Championships
2012 in women's swimming